Quéant Mountain is located directly SW of Mount Spring-Rice, just inside the provincial boundary of British Columbia. It was named in 1918 after Quéant, a village in France.

See also
 Geography of British Columbia

References

Three-thousanders of British Columbia
Canadian Rockies